Zoë Mozert (April 27, 1907 – February 1, 1993), born Alice Adelaide Moser, was an American illustrator. She was also known as one of the early 20th century's most famous pin-up artists and models.

Career
In 1925 Mozert entered the Pennsylvania Museum School of Industrial Art where she studied under Thornton Oakley, a former student of Howard Pyle, and modeled to raise money for tuition. 

During her career, Mozert painted hundreds of magazine covers and movie posters. She frequently was her own model, using cameras or mirrors to capture the pose. Her paintings are best known for their pastel style and realistic depiction of women.

In 1941, publishers Brown & Bigelow bought Mozert's first nude and signed her to an exclusive calendar contract. During World War II, her pin-up series for the company, called Victory Girls, was published both in calendar and mutoscope-card form. In 1946, Mozert created the publicity poster for Republic Pictures' Calendar Girl, a movie about the Gibson Girl. That same year, she painted the pinups for the Errol Flynn comedy Never Say Goodbye, in which Flynn played a pinup artist. (She also created the illustrations shown in the movie's opening credits.) By 1950, Mozert had become one of the "big four" illustrators nationally, along with Rolf Armstrong, Earl Moran and Gil Elvgren.

Some of Mozert's most famous works include the poster for Paramount Pictures' True Confession starring Carole Lombard,  the poster for the Howard Hughes film The Outlaw with Jane Russell, and, her most popular image, Song of the Desert (1950).

See also
 List of pin-up artists
 The Outlaw

References

The Great American Pin-Up, Martignette/Meisel (c) 2002 Taschen GmbH
Reel Art: Great Posters From the Golden Age of the Silver Screen, Rebello, Stephen (c) 1988 Abbeville Press

External links
Zoe Mozert artwork, American Art Archives website
Zoë Mozert biography, Pulp Artists website 

1907 births
1993 deaths
Pin-up artists
American women illustrators
American illustrators
Artists from Colorado Springs, Colorado
20th-century American women artists